Owlad (also Romanized as Owlād; also known as Boneh-ye Owlād) is a village in Abezhdan Rural District, Abezhdan District, Andika County, Khuzestan Province, Iran. At the 2006 census, its population was 299, in 62 families.

References 

Populated places in Andika County